Morris Heights is a residential neighborhood located in the West Bronx. Its boundaries, starting from the north and moving clockwise are: West Burnside Avenue to the north, Jerome Avenue to the east, the Cross-Bronx Expressway to the south, and the Harlem River to the west. University Avenue is the primary thoroughfare through Morris Heights.

The neighborhood is part of Bronx Community Board 5, and its ZIP Codes include 10453 and 10452. The area is patrolled by the New York City Police Department's 46th Precinct. New York City Housing Authority (NYCHA) property in the area is patrolled by P.S.A. 7 at 737 Melrose Avenue in the Melrose section of the Bronx.

History
Morris Heights was formerly the home of Gas Engine & Power Company & Charles L. Seabury Company, a shipbuilding firm located on Mathewson Road near what is today the location of Roberto Clemente State Park. Founded in 1896 by the merger of the formerly separate Gas Engine & Power Company & Charles L. Seabury Company, the firm operated along Morris Heights' waterfront until it moved to City Island following World War II.

After a wave of arson ravaged the low-income communities of New York City throughout the 1970s, many if not most residential structures in Morris Heights were left seriously damaged or destroyed. The city began to rehabilitate many formerly abandoned tenement-style apartment buildings and designate them low-income housing beginning in the late 1970s. Also, many subsidized attached multi-unit townhouses and newly constructed apartment buildings have been or are being built on vacant lots across the neighborhood.

Morris Heights is believed to be the site where Hip Hop culture originated in the 1970s. However, in the late 1960s and early 1970s, several disc jockeys protected by the Black Spades (a violent but organized gang that promoted their own form of justice; originally from Bronxdale Housing Projects and later recruited several members from Bronx River Housing Projects), and other gangs took their DJ-led block parties in the South Bronx, the East Side of the Bronx, and the West Side.

Demographics
Morris Heights has a population of around 36,779. Almost half the population lives below the poverty line and receives public assistance (TANF, Home Relief, Supplemental Security Income, and Medicaid). The vast majority of residents in the area are of Hispanic or African American descent. The majority of households are renter occupied.

Based on data from the 2010 U.S. census, the population of University Heights and Morris Heights was 54,188, a change of -147 (-0.3%) from the 54,335 counted in 2000. The racial makeup of the neighborhood was 1.4% (760) White, 31.8% (17,219) African American, 0.2% (106) Native American, 1.3% (688) Asian, 0% (11) Pacific Islander, 0.3% (158) from other races, and 0.8% (424) from two or more races. Hispanic or Latino of any race were 64.3% (34,822) of the population.

The entirety of Community District 5, which comprises Morris Heights, University Heights, and Fordham, had 136,151 inhabitants as of NYC Health's 2018 Community Health Profile, with an average life expectancy of 79.9 years. This is lower than the median life expectancy of 81.2 for all New York City neighborhoods. Most inhabitants are youth and middle-aged adults: 28% are between the ages of between 0–17, 29% between 25 and 44, and 23% between 45 and 64. The ratio of college-aged and elderly residents was lower, at 12% and 8% respectively.

As of 2017, the median household income in Community District 5 was $30,166. In 2018, an estimated 34% of Morris Heights and Fordham residents lived in poverty, compared to 25% in all of the Bronx and 20% in all of New York City. One in eight residents (13%) were unemployed, compared to 13% in the Bronx and 9% in New York City. Rent burden, or the percentage of residents who have difficulty paying their rent, is 65% in Morris Heights and Fordham, compared to the boroughwide and citywide rates of 58% and 51% respectively. Based on this calculation, Morris Heights and Fordham are considered low-income relative to the rest of the city and not gentrifying.

Land use and terrain

Morris Heights is dominated by five- and six-story tenement buildings, older multi-unit homes, vacant lots, newly constructed subsidized attached multi-unit townhouses, and apartment buildings. A significant percentage of the early 20th-century housing stock was structurally damaged by arson and eventually razed by the city. The total land area is less than half one square mile. The terrain is elevated and consists of many hills. Step streets connect areas located at different elevations.

Low-income public housing projects

Ten NYCHA developments are located in Morris Heights.
Harrison Avenue Rehab (Group A); one five-story rehabilitated tenement building.
Harrison Avenue Rehab (Group B); four rehabilitated buildings, five and six stories tall.
Macombs Road; two rehabilitated buildings, five and six stories tall.
Morris Heights Rehab; three rehabilitated tenement buildings, five and six stories tall
Sedgwick Houses; seven buildings, 14 and 16 stories tall.
University Avenue Rehab; four six-story rehabilitated tenement buildings.
West Tremont Avenue-Sedgwick Avenue Area; one 12-story building.
West Tremont Rehab (Group 1); two rehabilitated tenement buildings, five and six stories tall.
West Tremont Rehab (Group 3); one five-story rehabilitated tenement building.
West Tremont Rehab (Group 2); two six-story rehabilitated tenement buildings.

Police and crime
Morris Heights and Fordham are patrolled by the 46th Precinct of the NYPD, located at 2120 Ryer Avenue. The 46th Precinct ranked 27th safest out of 69 patrol areas for per-capita crime in 2010. , with a non-fatal assault rate of 126 per 100,000 people, Morris Heights and Fordham's rate of violent crimes per capita is greater than that of the city as a whole. The incarceration rate of 1,033 per 100,000 people is higher than that of the city as a whole.

The 46th Precinct has a lower crime rate than in the 1990s, with crimes across all categories having decreased by 74.6% between 1990 and 2022. The precinct reported 17 murders, 34 rapes, 384 robberies, 729 felony assaults, 218 burglaries, 611 grand larcenies, and 219 grand larcenies auto in 2022.

Fire safety
Morris Heights is served by the New York City Fire Department (FDNY)'s Engine Co. 43/Ladder Co. 59 fire station, located at 1901 Sedgwick Avenue.

Health
, preterm births and births to teenage mothers are more common in Morris Heights and Fordham than in other places citywide. In Morris Heights and Fordham, there were 93 preterm births per 1,000 live births (compared to 87 per 1,000 citywide), and 35.3 births to teenage mothers per 1,000 live births (compared to 19.3 per 1,000 citywide). Morris Heights and Fordham has a relatively average population of residents who are uninsured. In 2018, this population of uninsured residents was estimated to be 14%, higher than the citywide rate of 12%.

Sixteen percent of Morris Heights and Fordham residents are smokers, which is higher than the city average of 14% of residents being smokers. In Morris Heights and Fordham, 34% of residents are obese, 16% are diabetic, and 27% have high blood pressure—compared to the citywide averages of 24%, 11%, and 28% respectively. In addition, 24% of children are obese, compared to the citywide average of 20%.

Seventy-eight percent of residents eat some fruits and vegetables every day, which is less than the city's average of 87%. In 2018, 67% of residents described their health as "good," "very good," or "excellent," lower than the city's average of 78%. For every supermarket in Morris Heights and Fordham, there are 20 bodegas.

The nearest hospitals are Bronx-Lebanon Hospital Center in Claremont, James J. Peters VA Medical Center in Kingsbridge Heights, and St Barnabas Hospital in Belmont. Morris Heights Health Center also provides health services in the area.

Post offices and ZIP Codes
Morris Heights is covered by ZIP Codes 10453 and 10452. The United States Postal Service operates two post offices nearby: the Morris Heights Station at 2024 Jerome Avenue and the University Heights Station at 1541 Shakespeare Avenue.

Education 
Morris Heights and Fordham generally have a lower rate of college-educated residents than the rest of the city . While 10% of residents age 25 and older have a college education or higher, 34% have less than a high school education and 46% are high school graduates or have some college education. By contrast, 26% of Bronx residents and 43% of city residents have a college education or higher. The percentage of Morris Heights and Fordham students excelling in math rose from 19% in 2000 to 43% in 2011, and reading achievement increased from 24% to 28% during the same time period.

Morris Heights and Fordham's rate of elementary school student absenteeism is more than the rest of New York City. In Morris Heights and Fordham, 30% of elementary school students missed twenty or more days per school year, higher than the citywide average of 20%. Additionally, 66% of high school students in Morris Heights and Fordham graduate on time, lower than the citywide average of 75%.

Schools
Public schools include:
PS 109 (Popham Avenue and West Tremont Avenue)
PS 204: Morris Heights (Dr. Martin Luther King, Jr. Blvd. and West Tremont Avenue)
PS 274/MS 229: Roland N. Patterson (Harlem River Park Bridge and Sedgwick Avenue)
PS 306 (West Tremont and Jerome Avenues)
PS 396/MS 390 (West Burnside and Andrews Avenues)
IS 303: The Leadership and Community Service Academy (West 176th Street and Macombs Road)
MS 232: The Academy School (West 176th Street and Macombs Road)
MS 331: The Bronx School of Science Inquiry and Investigation (West Tremont and Davidson Avenue)
HS 365: The Academy for Language and Technology High School (West 176th Street and Macombs Road)

Library
The New York Public Library (NYPL) operates the Sedgwick branch at 1701 Martin Luther King Jr. Boulevard. The branch first opened in the Sedgwick Houses in 1951 before moving to its present two-story building in 1994.

Transportation

The following MTA Regional Bus Operations bus routes serve Morris Heights:
: to 238th Street station or George Washington Bridge Bus Terminal (via University Avenue)
: to 170th Street station (loop, via Macombs Road)
: to VA Hospital or Third Avenue–138th Street station (via Morris Avenue)
: to Castle Hill or George Washington Bridge Bus Terminal (via Tremont Avenue)
: to SUNY Maritime College or River Park Towers (via 180th Street, Tremont and Burnside Avenues)
: to Throggs Neck or River Park Towers (via 180th Street, Tremont and Burnside Avenues)

The following New York City Subway stations serve Morris Heights:
170th Street
Mount Eden Avenue
176th Street
Burnside Avenue
170th Street
174th–175th Streets
Tremont Avenue

The Metro-North Railroad's Hudson Line also serves Morris Heights via the Morris Heights station.

References

External links

 Living in Morris Heights - slideshow by The New York Times

 
Neighborhoods in the Bronx